HC Ukrainochka (ukr. ЖХК «Україночка») - is a Ukrainian women's ice hockey club in the capital city of Kyiv. It was created in 2015 and currently competes in the Ukrainian Women's Hockey League.

The home rinks of the club are the "Ice Arena" and the Kyiv Sports Palace. The colors of the team are blue and yellow.

History 

HC Ukrainochka was created on January 10, 2015. Originally, its members were women whose sons were playing hockey.

The club was hosted by the NHL to travel to the United States as part of a charity event.

On December 19, 2015, Ukrainochka played four friendly matches with the other women's team in Ukraine, the Dnipro Squirrels.

HC Ukrainochka played in the amateur league in Kyiv before becoming one of the founding teams of the Ukrainian Women's Hockey League in the 2016-2017 season. The first goal of the league was scored by Ukrainochka's forward, Yulia Dobrovolska

Roster

Goaltenders

Defensemen

Forwards

Management 

 President - Nadezhda Boboshko

Coaching Staff and Personnel 
 Head Coach - Evgeny Alipov (since August 2015)
 Coach - Andrei Kochur
 Coach - Alexander Nikulichev

References

Ice hockey teams in Ukraine
Sport in Kyiv
2015 establishments in Ukraine
Ice hockey clubs established in 2015